Cerithiopsis academicorum is a species of very small sea snail, a marine gastropod mollusk in the family Cerithiopsidae. This species is known from the Caribbean Sea and the Gulf of Mexico. It was described by Emilio Rolán and José Espinosa in 1996.

Description 

Habitat 

References

academicorum
Gastropods described in 1996